The 2012 Urawa Red Diamonds season is Urawa Red Diamonds' 12th consecutive season in J. League Division 1, and 46th overall in the Japanese top flight. Urawa Red Diamonds are also competing in the 2012 Emperor's Cup and 2012 J. League Cup.

Players

Competitions

J. League

League table

Matches

J. League Cup

Emperor's Cup

References

Urawa Red Diamonds
Urawa Red Diamonds seasons